The Jackson Jays were a Minor League Baseball team that played in Jackson, Tennessee, from 1924 to 1926. They competed in the Class D Kentucky–Illinois–Tennessee League (KITTY League) in 1924 as the Jackson Blue Jays. They moved to the Class D Tri-State League as the Jackson Giants in 1925 and became the Jackson Jays in 1926. Their home games were played at Athletic Park. Over three years of competition, they accumulated a 118–154 (.434) record.

History
Professional baseball was first played in Jackson, Tennessee, in 1903 by the Jackson Railroaders of the Kentucky–Illinois–Tennessee League. They were followed in the KITTY League by the Jackson Climbers in 1911.

The Jackson Blue Jays joined the KITTY League in 1924. They played their first game on May 13, losing to the Dyersburg Forked Deers, 2–0, before a home audience of 2,500 people at Athletic Park. They earned their first win the next afternoon, defeating Dyersburg, 5–4. The Blue Jays compiled a first season record of 51–61 (.455) and did not win either half of the league's split season.

The KITTY League failed to reorganize for the 1925 season, so Jackson joined the Class D Tri-State League. They also changed their name to the Jackson Giants. The Giants posted a season record of 40–63 (.388). The team changed its name to the Jackson Jays in 1926 as they continued in the Tri-State League. The circuit disbanded due to poor attendance after the games of July 5, the scheduled end of the first half. The Jays lost their final game to the Sheffield-Tuscumbia Twins, 7–6 in 14 innings. Their final record was 27–30 (.474). Over all three years of competition, Jackson accumulated a 118–154 (.434) record.

The city did not field another team until the Jackson Generals joined a revival of the KITTY League in 1935.

Season-by-season results

Notable players

The only Giant to also play in Major League Baseball was Ben Cantwell of the 1925 team, who made his major league debut in 1927 with the New York Giants—the start of an 11-year major league career.

References

External links
Statistics from Baseball-Reference
Statistics from Stats Crew

1924 establishments in Tennessee
1926 disestablishments in Tennessee
Baseball teams established in 1924
Baseball teams disestablished in 1926
Defunct baseball teams in Tennessee
Defunct minor league baseball teams
Defunct Tri-State League teams
Kentucky-Illinois-Tennessee League
Professional baseball teams in Tennessee
Sports in Jackson, Tennessee